The Surkhab, also known as the Surkh Rud, is a river in Afghanistan, which flows in the provinces of Paktia and Nangarhar.  It is a tributary of the Kabul River.

Course 
The river rises in the district of Azra in the far north of Paktia Province, but for most of its course flows in the province of Nangarhar.  It gives its name to the district of Surkh Rod. The river flows north-east, then east, to the north of the western part of the Safed Koh mountains, from which it receives meltwater from glaciers.  It enters the Kabul River some 10 km west of Jalalabad.

Tributaries

The Surkhab receives many tributaries, especially on its right bank from the snows of the Spin Ghar range.

External links
 Map of Nangarhar Province

Rivers of Afghanistan
Landforms of Nangarhar Province
Landforms of Paktia Province